These are all the matches played by the Spain national football team between 2010 and 2019:

Meaning

Results

2010
17 matches played:

2010 FIFA World Cup

Group stage

Knockout phase

2011
12 matches played:

2012
16 matches played:

UEFA Euro 2012

2013
17 matches played:

Notes

2014
12 matches played:

2015
9 matches played:

2016
15 matches played:

2017
10 matches played:

2018
14 matches played:

2019
10 matches played:

References

External links
Todos los partidos (all the games) at Selección Española de Fútbol (official site) 

2010s in Spain
2010
2010–11 in Spanish football
2011–12 in Spanish football
2012–13 in Spanish football
2013–14 in Spanish football
2014–15 in Spanish football
2015–16 in Spanish football
2016–17 in Spanish football
2017–18 in Spanish football
2018–19 in Spanish football
2019–20 in Spanish football